The disputed territories of Northern Iraq are regions defined by article 140 of the Constitution of Iraq as being Arabised during Baath Party rule in Iraq. Most of these regions are inhabited by non-Arabs, including Kurds, Assyrians, Yazidis, Turkmens/Turkomans, and Shabaks.

The disputed areas have been a core concern for many Arabs, Kurds and Turkmens, especially since the 2003 U.S. invasion of Iraq and the subsequent political restructuring. The Kurdistan Regional Government (KRG) gained control of territory to the south of the Kurdistan Region after 2003, taking over land they claimed as part of Iraqi Kurdistan.

During the Islamic State offensive in 2014, the KRG's Peshmerga forces took over more of the disputed territories. Kirkuk Governorate, strategically important because of its oil fields, was retaken by Iraqi government forces in the Battle of Kirkuk in 2017.

Tensions between Iraq and Iraqi Kurdistan in 2012 

Tensions between Iraqi Kurdistan and the central Iraqi government mounted through 2011–2012 on the issues of power sharing, oil production and territorial control. In April 2012, Masoud Barzani, president of the autonomous Iraqi Kurdistan Region, demanded that officials agree to their demands or face secession from Baghdad by September 2012.

In September 2012, the Iraqi government ordered the Kurdistan Regional Government (KRG) to transfer its powers over Peshmerga to the central government and relations were strained further by the formation of a new command center (Tigris Operation Command) for Iraqi forces to operate in a disputed area over which both Baghdad and the KRG claim jurisdiction.

On 16 November 2012, a military clash between the Iraqi forces and the Peshmerga resulted in one person being killed. CNN reported that 2 people were killed (one of them an Iraqi soldier) and 10 wounded in clashes at the town of Tuz Khurmato.

On the night of November 19, clashes between security forces of the central Iraqi government and the KRG forces in Tigrit left 12 Iraqi soldiers and one civilian dead, according to Doğan News Agency. The clash erupted when Iraqi soldiers attempted to enter northern Iraq; Peshmarga tried to prevent the Iraqi soldiers from entering the area upon Barzani's instructions. On November 25, it was reported that Iraqi Kurdistan sent reinforcements to a disputed area where its troops were involved in a standoff with the Iraqi army, despite calls on both sides for dialogue to calm the situation.

Territories included 

The Committee for implementing article 140 defines the disputed territories as those areas that were Arabised and whose borders were modified between 17 July 1968 and 9 April 2003. Those areas include parts of four governorates in pre-1968 borders.

One of the major problems in trying to implement Article 140 was a discrepancy in the definition of 'disputed area'. The article only refers to regions that would go through this normalization process as "Kirkuk and other disputed areas". In 2003, Kurdish negotiator Mahmud Othman suggested that Kurdish-majority areas south of the Green Line be attached to the KRG immediately, and 'mixed areas' should be questioned on a case-by-case basis. Sunni Arabs felt as if Kurds should gain no additional land as a result of the US invasion. Reattaching Kirkuk districts to reflect the 1975 boundaries posed many problems for Iraqis and brought along unintended consequences.

Nineveh Governorate 
Nineveh Governorate includes Aqra District and the northern part of Al-Shikhan District, which have been under Kurdish control since 1991, later, even the three districts of the Nineveh Plains of Assyrian, Yazidi and Shabak population as well as Sinjar town and Tel Afar District of mixed Arab and Yazidi population. Sinjar District and northern parts of Tel Afar District and Nineveh Plains is currently under the control of federal government of Iraq, as are most of Al-Hamdaniya (also called Bakhdida), Tel Kaif Districts, and everything else in the Governorate north of the Tigris River.

Erbil Governorate 
The disputed territories include Makhmur District which has been separated from the rest of the governorate since 1991. As of the 2017 Iraqi–Kurdish conflict, the district is contested between the federal government and Iraqi Kurdistan.

Kirkuk Governorate 

Kirkuk Governorate is defined by its pre-1968 borders, including Chamchamal and  Kalar districts of Sulaymaniyah Governorate and Tooz District of Salah ad Din and Kifri District of Diyala.

Kirkuk province borders were altered, the Kurdish-dominated districts were added to Erbil and Sulamaniya Governorates. The Arab districts were added to Kirkuk Governorate. Turkmen villages were added to Diyala and Salahuddin Governorates. On 12 June 2014, all of Kirkuk Governorate was taken by Kurdish forces when Iraqi army fled following the success of the ISIL 2014 Northern Iraq offensive. Kirkuk Governorate is currently under the control of the Iraqi central government.

Diyala and other governorates 
Disputed territories include Khanaqin, Kifri and Baladrooz districts of Diyala Governorate, Tooz District which is currently part of Salah ad Din Governorate, and Badra District which is currently part of Wasit Governorate.

See also 

Kirkuk status referendum
 List of disputed territories

References 

Geography of Iraq
Disputed territories in Asia
Iraqi–Kurdish conflict
Internal territorial disputes
Separatism in Iraq